Keita Sunama (砂間敬太, Sunama Keita, born 8 May 1995) is a Japanese swimmer. He won the bronze medal in the men's 200 metre backstroke at the 2018 Asian Games held in Jakarta, Indonesia.

In 2019, he represented Japan at the World Aquatics Championships held in Gwangju, South Korea. He competed in the men's 200 metre backstroke event.

He represented Japan at the 2020 Summer Olympics in Tokyo, Japan. He competed in the men's 200 metre backstroke event.

References

External links 
 

Living people
1995 births
Place of birth missing (living people)
Japanese male backstroke swimmers
Swimmers at the 2018 Asian Games
Medalists at the 2018 Asian Games
Asian Games bronze medalists for Japan
Asian Games medalists in swimming
Swimmers at the 2020 Summer Olympics
Olympic swimmers of Japan
Universiade medalists in swimming
Medalists at the 2015 Summer Universiade
Universiade silver medalists for Japan
Universiade bronze medalists for Japan
21st-century Japanese people